Hövelhof is a municipality in the district Paderborn, in North Rhine-Westphalia, Germany. Since 14 March 2012, Hövelhof can use the official additive Sennegemeinde (English: "Senne municipality").

Geography
Hövelhof is located in the Senne area, the eastern part of the Westfälische Bucht, approx. 10 km northwest of Paderborn. The eastern side of Hövelhof belongs to the Military Training Area Senne.

Neighbouring municipalities
 Augustdorf
 Bad Lippspringe
 Delbrück
 Schloß Holte-Stukenbrock
 Verl

Division of the municipality
Klausheide
 Staumühle
 Espeln
 Riege
 Hövelriege
Hövelsenne (mostly vacated)

Description

Unusually for a village as small as Hövelhof, it is relatively self-contained—there are numerous supermarkets, restaurants, clothes shops, travel agencies, pubs and much more, meaning that the village could theoretically remain independent of the city of Paderborn. In fact, the only common feature of a full-fledged town that is missing from Hövelhof is a cinema, for which inhabitants do indeed need to venture into Paderborn City Center—approximately 15 km (10 mi) away. It also has five schools, its own fire brigade, and a library.

Culture
Hövelhof has two main festivals during the year. The first is the Schützenfest, a celebration of the St. Hubertus Hunters' Guild, which takes place on the hunting grounds. The second is the Hövelmarkt, a general village fair with not only market stalls, but also fairground rides and traditional German dances, complete with traditional music and costume.

Nature 
Hövelhof is part of the Senne, the biggest heath landscape in North Rhine-Westphalia. There are many rivers and crooks that flow through the municipality area, from which the biggest one is the Ems.

Politics
The local government is dominated by the conservative CDU.

Coat of arms, seal and banner 
The coat of arms of Hövelhof shows historical and geographical symbols:

 The cross in the top field represented the bishop cross from the prince-bishops of Paderborn, who were the sovereigns since the Middle Ages up to 1803.
 The wave line symbolises the brooks and rivers, especially the river Ems.
 The hunting horn stands for the hunting castle, build by the prince-bishop Dietrich Adolf von der Recke in the year 1661. 
 The green color stands for the wealth of forest and green areas.

The seal contains the coat of arms with the transcription Gemeinde Hövelhof Krs. Paderborn. The banner is striped lengthways with green and white and has the coat of arms in the upper third.

Notable persons
 Heinz Stücke, world traveler and cyclist

Twin town
Hövelhof has a partnership with the French city Verrières-le-Buisson since 29 May 1971. The partnership consists of yearly meetups in either one of the two cities, student exchanges, and more. Hövelhof has also named a small park with a pond after Verrières-le-Buisson.

References

External links

  

Paderborn (district)